Tamiko is a feminine Japanese given name. In Kanji, it is written 民子, meaning "child of the people". It can also be written 多美子, meaning "many, beauty, child", hence "child of many beauties". Notable people with the name include:

 Tamiko Butler (born 1991), Antiguan cyclist
 Tamiko Jones (born 1945), American singer
 Tamiko Nash (born 1979), American actress
 Tamiko Thiel (born 1957), American artist
 Tamiko Yasui (born 1942), Japanese fencer

Middle name

 Sophie Tamiko Oda (born 1991), Japanese-American actress

Fictional characters

 Tamiko Ridley fictional character from the animated show Inside job

See also
 A Girl Named Tamiko, film

Japanese feminine given names